The 2022 Udmurt Republic head election took place on 9–11 September 2022, on common election day, coinciding with elections to the State Council of Udmurtia. Incumbent Head Aleksandr Brechalov was re-elected to a second term.

Background
In April 2017 Head of Udmurtia Aleksandr Solovyov was arrested for taking bribes. He was removed from office and replaced with Civic Chamber Secretary Alexander Brechalov. Brechalov won the subsequent head election with 78.16% of the vote.

In the 2021 Russian legislative election United Russia received only 35.63% in Udmurtia, which could prompt a potentially competitive head election in 2022. Despite United Russia's poor showing in the parliamentary elections, in January 2022 Vedomosti reported that Aleksandr Brechalov most likely would retain his position. In May 2022 President Vladimir Putin officially endorsed Brechalov for reelection.

Due to the start of Russian special military operation in Ukraine in February 2022 and subsequent economic sanctions the cancellation and postponement of direct gubernatorial elections was proposed. The measure was even supported by A Just Russia leader Sergey Mironov. Eventually, the postponement never occurred, as on 3 June State Council of the Udmurt Republic called head election for 11 September 2022.

Candidates
Only political parties can nominate candidates for head election in Udmurtia, self-nomination is not possible. However, candidate is not obliged to be a member of the nominating party. Candidate for Head of Udmurtia should be a Russian citizen and at least 30 years old. Each candidate in order to be registered is required to collect at least 7% of signatures of members and heads of municipalities (55-57 signatures). Also gubernatorial candidates present 3 candidacies to the Federation Council and election winner later appoints one of the presented candidates.

Registered
 Vadim Belousov (SR-ZP), Member of State Duma
 Aleksandr Brechalov (United Russia), incumbent Head of Udmurtia
 Aleksandr Syrov (CPRF), Member of Izhevsk City Duma, businessman
 Timur Yagafarov (LDPR), Member of State Council of the Udmurt Republic, 2017 head candidate

Withdrew after registration
 Georgy Leshchev (ZA!), individual entrepreneur (endorsed Brechalov)
 Vladimir Segal (RPPSS), pensioner

Did not file
 Yury Mishkin (Communists of Russia), individual entrepreneur, first secretary of CPCR regional committee

Withdrawn
 Sergey Antonov (PVR), political strategist

Declined
 Vladimir Bodrov (CPRF), Member of State Council of the Udmurt Republic, 2017 head candidate
 Vladimir Chepkasov (CPRF), former Member of State Council of the Udmurt Republic (2007-2017), 2014 head candidate

Candidates for Federation Council
Vadim Belousov (SR-ZP):
Andrey Blinov, Member of the Glazov City Duma, former Member of the State Council of the Udmurt Republic (2012-2017)
Sergey Gromov, entrepreneur
Vladimir Ovsyannikov, Member of the Seltinsky District Council of Deputies, stomatologist

Aleksandr Brechalov (United Russia):
Lyubov Glebova, incumbent Senator
Nadezhda Mikhaylova, First Deputy Speaker of the State Council of the Udmurt Republic
Sergey Smirnov, Chief of Staff to Head and Government of Udmurtia

Georgy Leschev (ZA!):
Vera Bushkova, education methodologist
Andrey Leshchev, candidate's father
Larisa Lescheva, candidate's mother

Vladimir Segal (RPPSS):
Aleksandr Berezin, pensioner
Lyudmila Korepanova, chair of RPPSS regional office
Vladimir Kulyabin, pensioner

Aleksandr Syrov (CPRF):
Natalya Ivanova, former Member of the Adam Council of Deputies (2012-2016)
Andrey Pichugin, private security agency director
Valentina Pudova, singer

Timur Yagafarov (LDPR):
Aleksandr Dodin, cultural organiser
Aleksey Kuznetsov, Member of the Zavyalovsky District Council of Deputies, engineer
Tatyana Shutova, Member of the Yakshur-Bodyinsky District Council of Deputies, college professor

Finances
All sums are in rubles.

Polls

Results

|- style="background-color:#E9E9E9;text-align:center;"
! style="text-align:left;" colspan=2| Candidate
! style="text-align:left;"| Party
! width="75"|Votes
! width="30"|%
|-
| style="background-color:;"|
| style="text-align:left;"| Aleksandr Brechalov (incumbent)
| style="text-align:left;"| United Russia
| 298,822
| 64.37
|-
| style="background-color:|
| style="text-align:left;"| Aleksandr Syrov
| style="text-align:left;"| Communist Party
| 91,876
| 19.79
|-
| style="background-color:;"|
| style="text-align:left;"| Timur Yagafarov
| style="text-align:left;"| Liberal Democratic Party
| 45,436
| 9.79
|-
| style="background-color:|
| style="text-align:left;"| Vadim Belousov
| style="text-align:left;"| A Just Russia — For Truth
| 15,352
| 3.31
|-
| style="text-align:left;" colspan="3"| Valid votes
| 451,486
| 97.25
|-
| style="text-align:left;" colspan="3"| Blank ballots
| 12,759
| 2.75
|- style="font-weight:bold"
| style="text-align:left;" colspan="3"| Total
| 464,248
| 100.00
|-
| style="background-color:#E9E9E9;" colspan="6"|
|-
| style="text-align:left;" colspan="3"| Turnout
| 464,248
| 38.79
|-
| style="text-align:left;" colspan="3"| Registered voters
| 1,166,781
| 100.00
|-
| colspan="5" style="background-color:#E9E9E9;"|
|- style="font-weight:bold"
| colspan="4" |Source:
|
|}

Incumbent Senator Lyubov Glebova (United Russia) was re-appointed to the Federation Council.

See also
2022 Russian gubernatorial elections

References

Udmurtia
Udmurtia
Politics of Udmurtia